Çiftlik Tunnel, is a highway tunnel constructed in Sinop Province, northern Turkey.

Çiftlik Tunnel is part of the Sinop-Samsun Highway  within the Black Sea Coastal Highway, of which construction was carried out by the Turkish Dağcan Construction and Trade Company Inc. The -long twin-tube tunnel carrying two lanes of traffic in each direction. The Demirciköy Tunnel follows the Çiftlik Tunnel in direction Samsun.

The tunnel was opened to traffic on 26 March 2014.

References

External links
 Map of road tunnels in Turkey at General Directorate of Highways (Turkey) (KGM)

Road tunnels in Turkey
Transport in Sinop Province
Tunnels completed in 2014